Babits is a surname. Notable people with the surname include:

 Laslo Babits (1958–2013), Canadian javelin thrower
 Lawrence Babits (born 1943), American archaeologist
 Mihály Babits (1883–1941), Hungarian poet, writer, and translator

Hungarian-language surnames